Su Chun-jung is a Taiwanese politician. He has served as the Deputy Minister of the Directorate-General of Personnel Administration since 20 May 2016.

Education
Su obtained his bachelor's degree in statistics from National Chung Hsing University in 1983 and master's degree in computer science from Boston University in the United States in 1988.

Career
At the Financial Data Center of the Ministry of Finance (MOF), he was the Deputy Director-General in 2009-2011 and Director-General in 2011–2013. In 2013–2016, he was the Director-General of Fiscal Information Agency of the MOF.

References

Living people
1960 births
Political office-holders in the Republic of China on Taiwan
National Chung Hsing University alumni
Boston University alumni